The men's fighting 69 kg competition in ju-jitsu at the 2013 World Games took place on 29 July 2013 at the Evangelista Mora Coliseum in Cali, Colombia.

Competition format
A total of 7 athletes entered the competition. They fought in stepladder system.

Results

Gold medal bracket

Bronze medal bracket

References

External links
 Results on IWGA website

Ju-jitsu at the 2013 World Games